In enzymology, a flavonol 3-O-glucosyltransferase is an enzyme that catalyzes the chemical reaction

UDP-glucose + a flavonol  UDP + a flavonol 3-O-beta-D-glucoside

Thus, the two substrates of this enzyme are UDP-glucose and flavonol, whereas its two products are UDP and flavonol 3-O-beta-D-glucoside. The flavonoids that can act as substrates within this reaction include quercetin, kaempferol, dihydrokaempferol, kaempferid, fisetin, and isorhamnetin. Flavonol 3-O-glucosyltransferase is a hexosyl group transfer enzyme.

This enzyme is known by the systematic name UPD-glucose:flavonol 3-O-D glucosyltransferase, and it participates in flavonoid biosynthesis and causes the formation of anthocyanins. Anthocyanins produce a purple color in the plant tissues that they are present in.

It is an enzyme found most notably in grapes (Vitis vinifera). This enzyme is found within a number of other plants as well—such as snapdragons (Antirrhinum majus), kale (Brassica oleracea), and grapefruit (Citrus x paradisi).

Pathways 
This enzyme is involved in the biosynthesis of secondary metabolites. The primary function of this enzyme within its pathway is binding a glucoside onto a flavonol molecule, forming a flavonol 3-O-glucoside. It is through this mechanism that the enzyme converts anthocyanidins to anthocyanins as a part of the phenylpropanoid pathway. One specific example would be this enzymes actions on pelargonidin. Flavonol 3-O-glucosyltransferase binds the glucoside to this protein, making pelargonidin 3-O-glucoside. This enzyme is also involved in the flavone glycoside pathway, and daphnetin modification in some organisms. The role of the enzyme in these pathways is, again, to bind a glucoside to the substrate to construct a flavonol 3-O-glucoside.

Nomenclature 

This enzyme belongs to the family of glycosyltransferases, specifically the hexosyltransferases.  The systematic name of this enzyme class is UDP-glucose:flavonol 3-O-D-glucosyltransferase. Other names in common use include:
 GTI, 
 uridine diphosphoglucose-flavonol 3-O-glucosyltransferase,
 UDP-glucose:flavonol 3-O-glucosyltransferase, and
 UDP-glucose:flavonoid 3-O-glucosyltransferase (UFGT).

Among those, UFGT is divided into UDP-glucose: Flavonoid 3-O-glucosyltransferase (UF3GT) and UDP-glucose: Flavonoid 5-O-glucosyltransferase (UF5GT), which are responsible for the glucosylation of anthocyanins to produce stable molecules.

Inhibitors and Structure of the Enzyme 

Some of the inhibitors of this enzyme include CaCl2, CoCl2, Cu+2, CuCl2, KCl, Mg+2, and Mn+2. The primary active site residue of this enzyme is Asp181, as determined by studies of how mutations affect enzyme capacity. There are several documentations of the crystalline structure of flavonol 3-O-glucosyltransferase (2C1X, 2C1Z, and 2C9Z), and, based on these renderings of the enzyme, there is only one subunit in the quaternary structure of the molecule.

References

Further reading 

 
 

EC 2.4.1
Enzymes of known structure
Flavonols metabolism